Chataz and Chetez may refer to:
 Chataz, Ijrud
 Chataz, Mahneshan